Yacoubian is an Armenian surname. Notable people with the surname include:

Hagop Yacoubian, proprietor of the Yacoubian Building in Cairo, Egypt
Paula Yacoubian (born 1976), Lebanese journalist, TV personality, politician and Member of Parliament
Yacoub Yacoubian, proprietor of the Yacoubian Building in Beirut, Lebanon

See also
Yacoubian Building (disambiguation)

Armenian-language surnames